Robert Tanneveau (25 July 1911 – 15 May 1993) was a French racing cyclist. He rode in the 1936 Tour de France.

References

1911 births
1993 deaths
French male cyclists
Place of birth missing